Toyoko Oku (born 14 June 1966) is a Japanese archer. She competed in the women's individual and team events at the 1988 Summer Olympics.

References

1966 births
Living people
Japanese female archers
Olympic archers of Japan
Archers at the 1988 Summer Olympics
Place of birth missing (living people)
20th-century Japanese women